"Fatshan", sometimes referred to as "Foshan", is a prefecture-level city in central Guangdong Province, China.

Fatshan may also refer to:

Battles 

 Battle of Fatshan Creek, part of the Second Opium War.

Places 

 Foshan, Guangdong Province, China.

Railways 

 Canton Fatshan Railway

Ships 

 SS Fatshan, 1887 ship.
 SS Fatshan, 1933 ship.